Sarunga is a monotypic moth genus of the family Erebidae. Its only species, Sarunga calida, is found in Bangladesh. Both the genus and species were first described by Francis Walker in 1869.

References

Calpinae
Monotypic moth genera